The Gabi is a handmade cloth worn by Ethiopians mainly over the shoulders and upper body, and is made out of cotton. Unlike the two-layered kuta (worn by men) and netela (worn by women), it consists of four layers. 

Characterized by its thickness, the Gabi is the traditional garment of men belonging to the Amhara ethnic group due to the high altitude nature of their homeland, most of the time it's worn by the elderly and clergy. Usually Amhara women get together for spinning the yarn required to make several Gabi's. Amhara women present Gabi's as a gift for their husbands.

See also
 Bernos
 Netela

References

Ethiopian clothing